De Michele (alternatively DeMichele or De Michèle) is an Italian and French surname meaning "of Michele". People with the surname include:

 Gabriel De Michèle (born 1941), French footballer
 Graziella de Michele (born 1956), French singer
 Michael DeMichele, American poker player

See also
 DiMichele
 Michaelson (surname)

Italian-language surnames
French-language surnames
Patronymic surnames
Surnames from given names